Federal Highway 117 (Carretera Federal 117) is a Federal Highway of Mexico. The highway travels from Tlatempa, Tlaxcala in the north to San Martín Texmelucan, Puebla to the south.

References

117